Clutha District is a local government district of southern New Zealand, with its headquarters in the Otago town of Balclutha. Clutha District occupies the majority of the geographical area known as South Otago.

Geography

The geography of the Clutha District is dominated by the valley of the Clutha River, which flows southeast from the lakes of Central Otago, bisecting the Clutha District and reaching the Pacific Ocean via two river mouths, one of which is not far from Kaitangata, the other is closer to Kaka Point. The two branches of the river (the Matau and the Kouau) form the island of Inch Clutha.  To the south of this is the rough bush country of the Catlins, with its forests and rugged coastline. To the north of the Clutha valley is mainly rolling hill country, with the plain of the Tokomairaro River to the northeast, along with Lake Waihola and Lake Waipori, which are part of the catchment of the Taieri River. The Waipori River, the Taieri's largest tributary, forms the northeastern border of Clutha District.

Administration
Clutha District is under the local body administration of the Clutha District Council, based in Balclutha. It is administered at a regional level by the Otago Regional Council, based in Dunedin.

Clutha District was formerly composed of three separate counties (Clutha, Bruce, and Tuapeka), and two boroughs (Balclutha and Milton). These were amalgamated into one district authority in 1989 as part of a nationwide reorganisation of local government.

Bruce, an area surrounding Milton, and including the Tokomairaro Plains, had an area of 1,357 km². It included the townships of Waihola, Milburn and Waitahuna. Clutha, which included the delta of the Clutha River and extended down the Catlins coast, had an area of 2,664.5 km². It included the townships of Kaitangata, Stirling, Owaka, and Benhar. The remaining area, Tuapeka, was centred on Lawrence, and included the inland valleys of the Clutha River and its tributaries the Pomahaka River and Tuapeka River. It had an area of 2,323 km².

The current mayor is Bryan Cadogan, who defeated incumbent mayor Juno Hayes in the 2010 local body elections, and retained the mayoralty in the 2013, 2016 and 2019 elections. Mr Cadogan's deputy is Stewart Cowie.

Demographics
The most populous town in Clutha District is Balclutha, which lies 81 km south of Dunedin by road. Other towns are Milton (pop. ), Kaitangata, Tapanui, Lawrence, Owaka, Stirling, Clinton, Kaka Point, and Benhar.

Clutha District had a population of 17,667 at the 2018 New Zealand census, an increase of 777 people (4.6%) since the 2013 census, and an increase of 828 people (4.9%) since the 2006 census. There were 7,020 households. There were 9,195 males and 8,472 females, giving a sex ratio of 1.09 males per female. The median age was 42.6 years (compared with 37.4 years nationally), with 3,411 people (19.3%) aged under 15 years, 2,898 (16.4%) aged 15 to 29, 8,271 (46.8%) aged 30 to 64, and 3,087 (17.5%) aged 65 or older.

Ethnicities were 88.8% European/Pākehā, 12.4% Māori, 1.9% Pacific peoples, 3.6% Asian, and 1.9% other ethnicities. People may identify with more than one ethnicity.

The percentage of people born overseas was 11.3, compared with 27.1% nationally.

Although some people objected to giving their religion, 54.7% had no religion, 34.3% were Christian, 0.3% were Hindu, 0.4% were Muslim, 0.7% were Buddhist and 1.7% had other religions.

Of those at least 15 years old, 1,611 (11.3%) people had a bachelor or higher degree, and 3,822 (26.8%) people had no formal qualifications. The median income was $30,900, compared with $31,800 nationally. 1,620 people (11.4%) earned over $70,000 compared to 17.2% nationally. The employment status of those at least 15 was that 7,539 (52.9%) people were employed full-time, 2,235 (15.7%) were part-time, and 393 (2.8%) were unemployed.

References

External links

Clutha District Council